Stade An Der Trell is a football stadium in Erpeldange-sur-Sûre, in central Luxembourg.

It is currently the home stadium of FC 72 Erpeldange.  The stadium has a capacity of 1,000.

References

An Der Trell